Samuel Groth OLY, MP (born 19 October 1987) is an Australian politician and a former professional tennis player. Sitting as a member of the Victorian Legislative Assembly, Groth represents the Liberal Party in the seat of Nepean. He is also the Shadow Minister for Youth and Shadow Minister for Tourism, Sport and Events since December 2022.

His highest ATP singles ranking was World No. 53, which he reached in August 2015. His career high in doubles was World No. 24, reached in February 2015. Groth's best singles result was a semi-final appearance at the 2014 Hall of Fame Tennis Championships. He hit the fastest serve on record at 263 km/h (163.4 mph) in 2012 at the ATP Challenger in Busan. Prior to his political career, he worked for the Nine Network's tennis broadcasts and as a host on Postcards.

Tennis career

Juniors
Groth and Andrew Kennaugh of Great Britain lost in the finals of the 2005 Wimbledon boys' doubles championship to Jesse Levine and Michael Shabaz 6–4, 6–1.

2007–2013: Fastest serve on record
Groth beat Mark Philippoussis in a 2007 match; Philippoussis subsequently focused on the seniors tour. Groth qualified for the ATP event in Nottingham where he defeated Britain's Jamie Baker 7–6, 6–3 in the first round. He lost his second round match to seeded Gilles Simon 7–6(7–1), 4–6, 4–6.

At the 2009 Australian Open he set a record for the fastest serve by a male player (232 km/h). He lost in the qualification to Wimbledon 2009 to Jesse Levine 4–6, 7–6, 5–7.

In 2012, in an ATP Challenger in Busan, Groth hit the fastest serve on record with a 163.4 mph (263 km/h) ace, but lost the match to Uladzimir Ignatik, 4–6, 3–6.

In November 2013, he reached the final of the Champaign Challenger, eventually losing in 3 sets to Tennys Sandgren 6–3, 3–6, 6–7. However, by reaching the final there, and the semi final of Toyota Challenger the following week, his ranking improved to a career high of #173.

2014
In 2014, Groth was awarded a wild card into the main draw at the Brisbane International, where he made the quarter finals. This is his first ATP World Tour quarter final appearance.

On 8 January, Groth was awarded a wild card into the 2014 Australian Open, but lost in round one to 28th seed, Vasek Pospisil in straight sets.

In March, Groth qualified for Indian Wells Masters, but lost in round 1 to Mikhail Kukushkin, 4–7 in the third set tie-break.

On 17 March, Groth entered and won the Rimouski Challenger in Canada. This was his first Challenger tour title. Two weeks later, he made the final of the León Challenger, but lost to #1 seed, Rajeev Ram. This gave him a new career high ranking of 136.

At the 2014 French Open, Groth made it to the last round of qualifying, but lost to Simone Bolelli 4–6, 2–6. This was his best French Open result to date. He partnered Andrey Golubev in the Men's doubles, where they made it to the semi final. This increased his doubles ranking to a career high of #41. In June, Groth made the final of the 2014 Aegon Nottingham Challenge but lost to compatriot Nick Kyrgios 6–7(3–7), 6–7(7–9). Groth made his Wimbledon debut after winning his way through qualifying, but lost in round 1 to Alexandr Dolgopolov in three sets.
In July. Groth entered the Hall of Fame Tennis Championships, where he reached his maiden ATP semi-final, defeating defending champion Nicolas Mahut in the quarter finals. This achievement saw him break into the top 100 rankings for the first time.

In August, Groth won his first Grand Slam match, defeating Albert Ramos-Viñolas 6–3, 7–6(7–5), 6–3 in the 2014 US Open. In the second round, he was defeated by Roger Federer in straight sets 4–6, 4–6, 4–6.

2015: Breakthrough

Groth started the 2015 season at the 2015 Brisbane International, where he was awarded a wild card into the main draw. He defeated defending champion Lleyton Hewitt in round one, and then Łukasz Kubot in the second round before losing to eventual finalist Milos Raonic in the quarter finals 6–7(5–7), 6–3, 6–7(2–7).
At the Australian Open, Groth defeated Filip Krajinović in round one, Thanasi Kokkinakis in round two before losing to Bernard Tomic in round 3. This was his best grand slam performance to date. In February, Groth headed to North America and lost in round 2 of Memphis to eventual runner-up Kevin Anderson. Groth lost in round 1 of Delray, Acapulco, Indian Wells and Miami. He then played the 2015 U.S. Men's Clay Court Championships and defeated Víctor Estrella Burgos in the first round. He then played top seed Feliciano López in the second round but lost in straight sets.

Groth then played at the Santaizi Challenger as the 2nd seed. He cruised through to the final where he defeated Konstantin Kravchuk to win the title. His next tournament was the Busan Open where he was again the 2nd seed. He defeated compatriot Alex Bolt in the first round but then lost to Franco Skugor. At the 2015 French Open, Groth led 21st seed Pablo Cuevas by a set in round 1, before losing in 4 sets.

Groth started his grass court season at the Manchester Challenger where he reached the final and defeated compatriot Luke Saville to win the title. He then competed at the ATP 2015 Mercedes Cup where he defeated Sergiy Stakhovsky in the first round. He then scored his first top 20 win by defeating world number 12 Feliciano López to reach the quarter final. At Wimbledon, Groth defeated 31st seed Jack Sock in round 1, compatriot James Duckworth in round 2 and set up a round 3 match against Roger Federer.
In this 3rd round match, he made the second fastest serve ever at the Wimbledon tournament (147 mph), and was the only player to take a set off of Federer until the final, losing to the 7-time champion 4–6, 4–6, 7–6(7–5), 2–6. Groth then represented Australia at the 2015 Davis Cup Quarterfinals. Australia was down 2–0 to Kazakhstan when Groth played the doubles rubber with Lleyton Hewitt. The pair won in straight sets to take the tie to 2–1. Groth then replaced Nick Kyrgios to play Mikhail Kukushkin where he defeated him in 4 sets to level the tie at 2–2. Hewitt then won the 5th rubber to ensure Australia a place in the Davis Cup semi-finals.
Groth next contested the Bogota Open as the 6th seed where he defeated Guido Pella before losing to former world number 8 Radek Štěpánek in straight sets. He then played in Atlanta and defeated Frances Tiafoe in the first round. He then lost to eventual finalist and fifth seed Marcos Baghdatis in 3 sets. Groth then competed at the 2015 Citi Open and reached his first ATP500 Quarterfinal after defeating Thomaz Bellucci, 9th seeded Viktor Troicki and 7th seeded Feliciano López before losing to eventual champion Kei Nishikori. This was also the first time Groth defeated back to back top 20 players. Groth next played at the 2015 Winston-Salem Open and defeated Jared Donaldson before losing to eventual semi-finalist Steve Johnson. Groth then played at the 2015 US Open, defeating former world number 13 Alexandr Dolgopolov in round 1, but then losing to 26th seed Tommy Robredo in round 2. Groth also played the Men's Doubles with Lleyton Hewitt, losing in the 2nd round.

2016: Loss of form
Groth commenced the 2016 season with a wild card into Brisbane International. He lost to Chung Hyeon in round one. He also lost in round one at the Sydney International to Federico Delbonis. At the Australian Open, Groth defeated Adrian Mannarino before losing to number 2 seed Andy Murray in the second round. Groth partnered Lleyton Hewitt in the men's double at the Australian Open. They made the third round. Groth then had a first round to Frances Tiafoe loss at a Dallas Challenger. Groth had another first round loss to Illya Marchenko at the Memphis Open. Groth lost in the first round to Noah Rubin in the Delray Beach International Tennis Championships. Groth also lost in the first round in Acapulco to Dmitry Tursunov. Groth played for Australia in Davis Cup World Group losing his singles match to John Isner in straight sets. He had a first round loss at the first Masters 1000 of the year at Indian Wells to Leonardo Mayer. Groth then defeated Victor Estrella Burgos at the Miami but he lost to Dominic Thiem in the second round. Groth played a number of Challenger tournaments across Asia with little success. At the 2016 French Open, Groth lost in round 1 to 9-time champion Rafael Nadal. At 2016 Wimbledon, Groth lost in round 1 to Kei Nishikori. Groth had a last minute call-up to represent Australia at the 2016 Summer Olympics in Rio de Janeiro, but lost in the first round to Belgium’s David Goffin. Groth played across North America with limited success on the singles ATP World Tour, but won his second doubles title in Newport before returning to the Challenger Circuit, winning his 4th single title in Las Vegas. Groth ended 2016 with a ranking of 185.

2017
Groth commenced the 2017 with a wild card into the 2017 Brisbane International, where he defeated Pierre-Hugues Herbert before losing to Dominic Thiem in round 2. Groth reached the quarter final of the 2017 Canberra Challenger, losing to eventual champion Dudi Sela. Groth lost in round 1 of the 2017 Australian Open to Steve Darcis, but paired with Chris Guccione to reach the quarter final of the doubles, losing to eventual champions Henri Kontinen and John Peers.
In February, Groth was selected to play in round 1 the 2017 Davis Cup against Czech Republic, he paired with John Peers to win the doubles taking Australia to an unbeatable 3–0. Groth went to North America but lost in qualifying for Indian Wells Masters and Drummondville Challenger singles but won the doubles at Drummondville. In June, Groth made the semi final of Ilkley Trophy.

2018: Retirement
2018 Australian Open turned out to be Groth's last tournament before retirement. He lost in singles qualifying to Taylor Fritz. He paired with former world no. 1 compatriot Lleyton Hewitt in doubles and reached the quarterfinals. He paired with compatriot Samantha Stosur in mixed doubles.

ATP career finals

Doubles: 5 (2 titles, 3 runner-ups)

ATP Challenger and ITF Futures finals

Singles: 22 (11–11)

Doubles: 40 (30–10)

Junior Grand Slam finals

Doubles: 1 (1 runner-up)

Performance timelines

Singles

Doubles

Political career 
  
On 22 February 2022, Groth, a member of the Liberal Party since 2021, won pre-selection for the Liberal Party in the marginal Labor-held electorate of Nepean, the electorate in which Groth resides. This would allow Groth to contest the electorate for the party in the upcoming Victorian election (November 2022). Groth had told Sky News Australia he was frustrated with the COVID-related lockdowns in Victoria. Groth won the three-candidate contest with seventy-four votes (67%), compared with runner-up David Burgess' thirty-three, and former Bentleigh MP Elizabeth Miller with four. He had the backing of former Victorian Premier Jeff Kennett, Federal Treasurer at the time, Josh Frydenberg, state MP for Brighton James Newbury and former Nepean MP Martin Dixon.

2022 Victorian election  

Contesting a former safe Liberal seat, and one of the most marginal Labor-held seats at the previous election (2018), Groth stood a good chance of regaining the seat for the party. Speaking before the election, Groth stated of his possibility to win the seat: “It's been extremely positive. I'm confident, if we are to have any chance tonight of the Liberal Party and the Coalition getting into government in this state, Nepean is the one that has to turn.”

Groth claimed victory of Nepean the night of the election. After the election, Groth was appointed as Shadow Minister for Youth and Shadow Minister for Tourism, Sport and Events in the Pesutto shadow ministry.

Personal life
Groth was born in Narrandera, New South Wales, and grew up in the Riverina area of southern New South Wales. Groth is an avid supporter of the Sydney Swans in the Australian Football League. He was also a member of Vermont Football Club reserve squad during a hiatus from tennis in 2011.

In January 2019 Groth received the OLY post-nominal title at the Brisbane International tournament.

Between 2009 and 2011, Groth was married to fellow Australian tennis player Jarmila Wolfe.

Groth married long-time partner Brittany Boys in 2018. Boys, a Melburnian, was an amateur women's tennis player and competed at the university level for the University of Richmond in the United States. Groth and Boys have two young children, twins Mason and Parker, born in April 2021. Groth lives with his family in Blairgowrie, Victoria.

Notes

References

External links

 
 
Sam Groth Athletic DNA Profile

1987 births
Living people
Australian male tennis players
Tennis people from New South Wales
Olympic tennis players of Australia
Tennis players at the 2016 Summer Olympics